Liam Reddox (born January 27, 1986) is a Canadian former professional ice hockey player. He most notably played in the National Hockey League (NHL) with the Edmonton Oilers and Captained the Växjö Lakers of the Swedish Hockey League (SHL). He has dual citizenship in both Canada and Scotland.

Playing career
As a youth, Reddox played in the 2000 Quebec International Pee-Wee Hockey Tournament with the Toronto Marlboros minor ice hockey team.

Reddox was drafted in the fourth round of the 2002 Ontario Hockey League priority selection to the Peterborough Petes.  He played four games with the team as a callup during the 2002–03 season.  Reddox, who currently lives in Whitby, Ontario, led the Petes in scoring in his first two full years with the team, including his rookie season in 2003–04.

In 2004, Reddox played in the IIHF World U-18 Hockey Tournament for Canada, where he is currently tied for 2nd amongst players all-time for “Most Goals in a Single Tournament”,  behind only Connor McDavid. 

Reddox spent three years with the Peterborough Petes, in which he played with both Eric and Jordan Staal, Calgary Flames prospect Daniel Ryder (the younger brother of Michael Ryder) and former Oiler, Bryan Young.  Reddox played on a line with Ryder and Buffalo Sabres draft choice Patrick Kaleta.  On the powerplay, he would be the second defenceman alongside Columbus Blue Jackets draft pick Trevor Hendrikx, and had Steve Downie, a Philadelphia Flyers draft, on the wing.

Reddox amassed 86 goals and 124 assists for 210 points during his 208 games he played with the Peterborough Petes.  He was an assistant to captain Jamie Tardif in the 2005–06 season, in which the Petes won the Ontario Hockey League championship, in the team's 50th anniversary.

Reddox was signed to the Edmonton Oilers, who drafted him in the fourth round (112th overall) in the 2004 NHL Entry Draft, on June 1, 2006. He spent his first professional season in the Oilers organization with ECHL affiliate, the Stockton Thunder before moving up to the American Hockey League for the 2007–08 season with the Springfield Falcons. After making his NHL debut with a single appearance for the Oilers he was returned to the Falcons to end the year. In the 2008–09 season, Reddox was called up from the Falcons on November 14, 2008. Reddox then scored his first career NHL goal in just his second career game on November 15, 2008, against the Colorado Avalanche.

On August 9, 2010, Reddox was re-signed by the Oilers to a one-year contract.

On May 24, 2011, Reddox signed an initial one-year contract with the Växjö Lakers of the then named Elitserien.

Following the 2018–19 season, having completed his 8th season with the Lakers, and 4th as Captain, Reddox left the club at the conclusion of his contract on April 4, 2019. In August 2019, Reddox signed for the Belfast Giants of the United Kingdom's Elite Ice Hockey League.

Career statistics

Regular season and playoffs

International

References

External links

1986 births
Living people
Belfast Giants players
Canadian ice hockey left wingers
Canadian expatriate ice hockey players in Sweden
Edmonton Oilers draft picks
Edmonton Oilers players
Sportspeople from Whitby, Ontario
Oklahoma City Barons players
Ice hockey people from Ontario
Peterborough Petes (ice hockey) players
Stockton Thunder players
Springfield Falcons players
Växjö Lakers players
Canadian expatriate ice hockey players in the United States
Canadian expatriate ice hockey players in Northern Ireland
Canadian people of Scottish descent